Kruki may refer to the following places:
Kruki, Łódź Voivodeship (central Poland)
Kruki, Mińsk County in Masovian Voivodeship (east-central Poland)
Kruki, Ostrołęka County in Masovian Voivodeship (east-central Poland)
Kruki, Warmian-Masurian Voivodeship (north Poland)